The archipelago of Cape Verde has been struck by a series of drought-related famines between the 1580s and the 1950s. During these periods of drought and famine, tens of thousands of inhabitants died from starvation and diseases.

Background
The Cape Verde islands have a generally hot semi-arid climate, with substantial rainfall limited to the summer months August and September. The driest areas are the low eastern islands (Maio, Sal and Boa Vista), and the southwestern parts of the more mountainous islands. The higher and northeastern, windward parts receive more precipitation. Agriculture strongly depends on the summer rains; in years with less rain, crop failure was common. The situation was further aggravated by unsuitable crop choice, overpopulation, overgrazing, soil erosion and inadequate response from the Portuguese colonial administration.

Historical famines
The following famines have been recorded:
1580-83, on Santiago, Maio and Brava
1609-11, on Santiago, combined with an epidemy of smallpox
1685-90, around 4,000 deaths on Santiago
1704-12, on Santiago, Maio, Boa Vista, and Sal
1719-23, on Santiago, São Nicolau, Maio, Sal, Boa Vista, and Fogo. The latter three islands were depopulated
1738-40, on São Nicolau
1747-50, on all islands
1773-75, over 20,000 deaths on all islands
1830-33, around 30,000 deaths on all islands
1854-56, 25% of the population died
1863-66, between 20,000 and 30,000 deaths on all islands

Famines in the 1940s

Two of Cape Verde's worst-ever famines occurred in 1941-43 and 1947-48, killing an estimated 45,000 people. The hardest hit were the islands of São Nicolau and Fogo, where resp. 28% and 31% of the population was killed. In 1946-48, Santiago lost 65% of its population. Several thousands of islanders emigrated, for instance accepting contract labour on the cocoa plantations of Portuguese São Tomé and Príncipe. Between 1900 and 1970, about 80,000 Cape Verdeans were shipped to São Tomé and Príncipe. The Estado Novo government of Portugal showed little interest in its African colony, and failed to take measures to improve access to fresh water, or supply food aid.

In popular culture
Fome 47 ("Famine of 47"), one of the best known songs by Cape Verdean musician Codé di Dona, relates the drought, famine and emigration to São Tomé in 1947. The third and final part of the novel Chiquinho by Baltasar Lopes da Silva is focused on the calamity of drought, a major problem in Cape Verde, which results in famine and many deaths.

See also
History of Cape Verde

References

Portuguese Cape Verde
Cape Verde
Natural disasters in Cape Verde
Cape Verdean American history
Cape Verdean diaspora